The flag of Azania is the state flag of Azania, an autonomous region in southwestern Somalia. The flag of Azania was similar to the one that previously existed in Russia from 1991 to 1993. It differed only in the aspect ratio, 2:3 instead of 1:2.

History 
There is no accurate and reliable information confirming which previous flag Azania had. However, it is known that on 13 March 2011, even before the official declaration of independence of state entity, the flag of Azania was established, completely identical to the current flag of Russia, in the center of which there is an elephant (it existed until 25 March when the elephant emblem was removed). There is also alleged information that the previous flag of Azania consisted of horizontal blue, red and green stripes and was similar to the flag of Azerbaijan. It's a combination of colors of South West State of Somalia, although there is no reliable information in primary sources about the variants of this original flag (hinting at the intention to lead not three, but six provinces, including South West State).

Colors 
The Azania flag consists of three colors: white, blue and red.

References

External links 

 Flag of Azania

Jubaland
Flags of Somalia
2011 establishments in Somalia